Alexandr Vladimirovich Popov (born 22 February 1965) is a Russian biathlete who competed for the USSR, the Unified Team and Belarus. Since 1999, he has been the head coach of the Belarus National Biathlon Team.

Biathlon results
All results are sourced from the International Biathlon Union.

Olympic Games
2 medals (1 gold, 1 silver)

World Championships
10 medals (4 gold, 4 silver, 2 bronze)

*During Olympic seasons competitions are only held for those events not included in the Olympic program.
**Team was added as an event in 1989, with pursuit being added in 1997.

Individual victories
5 victories (2 In, 3 Sp)

*Results are from UIPMB and IBU races which include the Biathlon World Cup, Biathlon World Championships and the Winter Olympic Games.

References

External links
 
 Profile 

1965 births
Living people
People from Tobolsk
Russian male biathletes
Soviet male biathletes
Belarusian male biathletes
Biathletes at the 1988 Winter Olympics
Biathletes at the 1992 Winter Olympics
Biathletes at the 1994 Winter Olympics
Biathletes at the 1998 Winter Olympics
Olympic biathletes of the Soviet Union
Olympic biathletes of the Unified Team
Olympic biathletes of Belarus
Medalists at the 1988 Winter Olympics
Medalists at the 1992 Winter Olympics
Olympic medalists in biathlon
Olympic silver medalists for the Unified Team
Olympic gold medalists for the Soviet Union
Biathlon World Championships medalists